The 2010–11 Notre Dame Fighting Irish men's basketball team represented the University of Notre Dame in the 2010–2011 NCAA Division I basketball season. The Fighting Irish were coached by Mike Brey and played their home games at the Edmund P. Joyce Center in Notre Dame, Indiana. The Fighting Irish are members of the Big East Conference. The team returned three starters from the 2009-10 NCAA Tournament squad, having seen the graduation of long-time starters Luke Harangody and Tory Jackson. They finished the season 27–7, 14–4 in Big East play and lost in the semifinals of the 2011 Big East men's basketball tournament to Louisville. They received an at large bid to the 2011 NCAA Division I men's basketball tournament where they defeated Akron in the second round before being upset by Florida State in the third round.

Awards and honors
Old Spice Classic Champions
Associated Press College Basketball Coach of the Year - Mike Brey
Sports Illustrated National Coach of the Year - Mike Brey
CBSSports.com National Coach of the Year - Mike Brey
Big East Coach of the Year - Mike Brey
Sports Illustrated 2nd Team All-American - Ben Hansbrough
Big East Player of the Year - Ben Hansbrough
Unanimous 1st Team All Big East - Ben Hansbrough
1st Team All-Academic - Tim Abromaitis
Big East Scholar-Athlete of the Year - Tim Abromaitis
3rd Team All Big East - Tim Abromaitis

Roster
Source

2010-11 Schedule and results
Source
All times are Eastern

|-
!colspan=9 style=| Exhibition

|-
!colspan=9 style=| Regular Season

|-
!colspan=9 style=| Big East tournament

|-
!colspan=9 style=| NCAA tournament

References

Notre Dame
Notre Dame Fighting Irish men's basketball seasons
Notre Dame
Fight
Fight